Trinorfolkia cristata, known commonly as the crested triplefin or crested threefin, is a species of triplefin blenny in the genus Trinorfolkia. It was described by Rudie Kuiter in 1986. This species is endemic to the coasts of South Australia from Sceale Bay to Victor Harbor, including Kangaroo Island.

References

crested triplefin
Fish described in 1986